The 1971 NCAA University Division Wrestling Championships were the 41st NCAA University Division Wrestling Championships to be held. Auburn University in Auburn, Alabama hosted the tournament at Memorial Coliseum.

Oklahoma State took home the team championship with 94 points and three individual champions.

Team results

Individual finals

References
1971 NCAA Tournament Results
NCAA Wrestling History

NCAA Division I Wrestling Championship
NCAA
Wrestling competitions in the United States
NCAA University Division Wrestling Championships
NCAA University Division Wrestling Championships
NCAA University Division Wrestling Championships